Gimlekollen is a district in the city of Kristiansand in Agder county, Norway. It is a part of the borough of Lund. The district of Justvik lies to the north, the district of Lund (centrum) lies to the west and southwest, and the Topdalsfjorden lies to the east. NLA Media college is located in Gimlekollen. The lakes Vollevannet and Gillsvannet lie in the district.

Transportation

Politics 
The 10 largest political parties in Gimlekollen in 2015:

Education
Gimlekollen NLA College is located in Gimlekollen.

Neighbourhoods

Photos

References

Populated places in Agder
Geography of Kristiansand
Boroughs of Kristiansand